Reen is a given name. Notable people with the name include:

 Reen Kachere (1954–2022), Malawian politician
 Reen Nalli (born 1951), American music executive
 Reen Yu (born 1987), Taiwanese actress and model

See also
 Reem (given name)
 Reen Manor